Eaglehawk is another name for the wedge-tailed eagle.

Eaglehawk may also refer to:
Eaglehawk, Victoria is a suburb of Bendigo, itself a part of the City of Greater Bendigo in Victoria, Australia
Eaglehawk Neck, an isthmus connecting the Tasman Peninsula to the Forestier Peninsula in Tasmania, Australia
Biraban, also known as Eagle Hawk